Mădălin Smaranda (born 5 September 1984) is a Romanian former footballer who played as a goalkeeper for teams such as UM Timișoara, UTA Arad, FC Bihor Oradea or ACS Poli Timișoara, among others.

Honours

Club
Fortuna Covaci
 Liga III (1): 2008–09
ACS Poli Timișoara
Liga II: 2014–15

References

External links
 
 profile at Liga1.ro
 

1984 births
Living people
Romanian footballers
Association football goalkeepers
Liga I players
Liga II players
Liga III players
CSP UM Timișoara players
ACS Fortuna Covaci players
FC UTA Arad players
FC Bihor Oradea players
ACS Poli Timișoara players
CSC Dumbrăvița players
Sportspeople from Slatina, Romania